The 1960 Colorado Buffaloes football team was an American football team that represented the University of Colorado in the Big Eight Conference during the 1960 NCAA University Division football season. Led by second-year head coach Sonny Grandelius, the Buffaloes compiled an overall record of 6–4 with a conference mark of 5–2 placing third in the Big 8. Big Eight official stripped Kansas of their win over Colorado, but both schools and the NCAA credit the win to Kansas, yet place Colorado second in the conference standings and Kansas third. Home games were played on campus at Folsom Field in Boulder, Colorado.

For the first time since joining the conference in 1948, Colorado defeated both Oklahoma and Nebraska in the same season; they tied both in 1952.

Schedule

Coaching staff
 Bob Ghilotti (ends)
 Chuck Boerio (LB)
 Buck Nystrom (line) 
 John Polonchek (backs)

References

External links
 Sports-Reference – 1960 Colorado Buffaloes

Colorado
Colorado Buffaloes football seasons
Colorado Buffaloes football